Voodoocult was a multinational thrash metal supergroup formed in 1993 by German Phillip Boa, vocalist of the alternative band Phillip Boa & The Voodooclub. The project was especially notable for the reputation of the participating musicians, such as Jim Martin (of Faith No More), Chuck Schuldiner (of Death), Slayer drummer Dave Lombardo, and Mille Petrozza of Kreator. The band released two albums and disbanded in 1996 after the release of the second album and a tour.

Discography 
Studio albums
 Jesus Killing Machine (1994)
 Voodoocult (1995)

Singles
 "Killer Patrol" (1994)
 "Metallized Kids" (1994)
 "When You Live as a Boy" (1995)

Band members 
Last line-up
 Phillip Boa – vocals
 "Big" Jim Martin – guitars
 Gabby Abularach – guitars
 Dave "Taif" Ball – bass
 Markus Freiwald – drums

Original line-up
 Phillip Boa – vocals
 Chuck Schuldiner – guitars
 Mille Petrozza – guitars
 Waldemar Sorychta – guitars
 Dave "Taif" Ball – bass
 Dave Lombardo – drums

External links 
 
 Voodoocult at Encyclopaedia Metallum

German thrash metal musical groups
Musical groups established in 1994
Musical groups disestablished in 1996
Alternative metal supergroups
Heavy metal supergroups